Pääjärvi may refer to:

Lakes
 Pääjärvi (Karstula), located in Karstula in the region of Keski-Suomi, Finland
 Pääjärvi (Lammi), located between the cities of Hämeenlinna and Hämeenkoski, Finland
 Lake Pyaozero (Finnish: Pääjärvi), located in the Republic of Karelia, Russia

Settlements
 Pyaozersky, a settlement in the Republic of Karelia, Russia, called Pääjärvi in Finnish

People
 Magnus Pääjärvi (born 1991), Swedish ice hockey player